Belém do Brejo do Cruz is the northernmost municipality in the Brazilian state of Paraíba.

References 

Populated places established in 1961
Municipalities in Paraíba